Belvedere station is an Edmonton Light Rail Transit in Edmonton, Alberta. It serves the Capital Line. It is a ground-level station located at Fort Road and 129 Avenue.

History
The station is one of the original five stations, and opened on April 22, 1978. At that time, Belvedere was the north east terminus of the line.

The original station had a single side platform and a single track.

The station underwent significant upgrades including a covered station, five car platform, and a grade separated pedestrian overpass—at a cost of $6.3 million, in 1998.

Belvedere Station won two awards, the Masonry Contractors Association of Alberta Award of Excellence and the Canadian Institute of Steel Construction, Alberta Steel Design Award in the Architectural Category for Most Effective and Innovative Use of Structural Steel.

Station layout
The station has a  centre loading platform that can accommodate two five-car LRT trains at the same time, with one train on each side of the platform.

The LRT station and transit centre has a park and ride lot with 780 parking spaces.

Public art
Belvedere Station is decorated with stained glass pieces entitled "Travail in Tandem" by Father Douglas osf.

Around the station
Belvedere
Transit Hotel

Belvedere Transit Centre

The Belvedere Transit Centre is located on the west side of the LRT station. It is connected to the station by a pedestrian overpass. It contains several amenities including Park & Ride, a drop off area, a large shelter, a pay phone and vending machines. There are no washrooms at this transit centre, but there are washrooms inside the LRT station.

The transit centre shelter was upgraded in 2017-2019 as part of a citywide $37.75 million transit centre improvement initiative $2.426 million in funding for the Belvedere Transit Centre renewal project was provided by the federal government. The new transit centre shelter opened on October 2, 2019.

The following bus routes serve the transit centre: 

The above list does not include LRT services from the adjacent LRT station.

References

External links

Edmonton Light Rail Transit stations
Railway stations in Canada opened in 1978
Edmonton Transit Service transit centres
Capital Line